Darya Imad Shah was the third Sultan of Berar. He reigned between 1530 and 1561.

Darya Imad Shah's attempts to rule peacefully meant dealing diplomatically with the local powers of Bijapur and Ahmadnagar. His daughter Daulat Shah Begum married the Ahmadnagar Sultan Hussain Nizam Shah I in 1558 on the banks of the Godavari River, and he came to the aid of his son-in-law against Aliya Rama Raya of the Vijayanagara Empire when he was subsequently attacked. This was an antecedent of the subsequent alliance between the Deccan Sultanates that fought in the Battle of Talikota. He died and was succeeded by his son, still an infant, in 1561.

Issue
Burhan Imad Shah, Sultan of the Berar Sultanate;
Daulat Shah Begum, married Hussain Nizam Shah I, Sultan of Ahmednagar;
Daughter, married Abdul Qadir, son of Burhan Nizam Shah I;

References

See also

Berar
Deccan sultanates
Imad Shahi dynasty
16th-century Indian Muslims
Sultans
16th-century Indian monarchs
Year of birth missing
1561 deaths